Kalophrynus nubicola is a species of frog in the family Microhylidae. It is endemic to Sarawak in Malaysian Borneo and is only known from the Gunung Mulu National Park. The specific name nubicola means "dwelling in cloud". Common names blue-spotted sticky frog and mossy-forest sticky frog has been coined for this species.

Description
Males measure  and adult females  in snout–vent length. The overall appearance is stout. The snout is short, rounded in dorsal view and truncate in profile. The tympanum is indistinct. The finger and the toe tips are slightly flattened and obtusely rounded; the toes have some webbing. Skin is smooth to shagreened above and weakly granular below. The dorsal coloration is brown with faint dark mottling. There is a dark-brown-edged yellow chevron on the snout and upper eyelids. The throat and chest are orange, heavily mottled with dark brown. Posteriorly, the belly has a pattern that varies from many small pale spots in a thin brown network, to a few large pale patches. Males have a median subgular vocal sac.

Habitat and conservation
Kalophrynus nubicola occurs in montane forests at elevations above . It is a terrestrial frog. Breeding presumably takes place in small, temporary forest pools. The known range is within the Gunung Mulu National Park, which is well protected; this species is not considered threatened, despite its relatively small range.

References

External links
 Sound recordings of Kalophrynus nubicola at BioAcoustica

Nubicola
Amphibians of Malaysia
Endemic fauna of Borneo
Endemic fauna of Malaysia
Amphibians described in 1983
Taxonomy articles created by Polbot
Amphibians of Borneo